Stan Wawrinka defeated Marcos Baghdatis in the final, 6–4, 7–6(15–13) to win the men's singles tennis title at the 2016 Dubai Tennis Championships.

Roger Federer was the two-time reigning champion, but withdrew due to a knee injury.

This marked the first tournament Novak Djokovic participated in where he failed to reach the final since the 2015 Qatar Open, snapping a streak of 17 finals, when he was forced to retire from his quarterfinal match against Feliciano López due to an eye injury.

Seeds

Draw

Finals

Top half

Bottom half

Qualifying

Seeds

Qualifiers

Qualifying draw

First qualifier

Second qualifier

Third qualifier

Fourth qualifier

References
 Main Draw
 Qualifying Draw

Dubai Tennis Championships - Men's Singles
2016 Dubai Tennis Championships